Maung Htin (born Htin Fatt) was a prolific Burmese writer and journalist, best known for his classic 1947 novel Nga Ba, which portrayed the lives of downtrodden farmers. In 2003, the Government of Myanmar awarded him with a national lifetime achievement award in literature. In 1933, he graduated from Rangoon University with a Bachelor of Arts degree in Burmese.

References

1909 births
2006 deaths
People from Ayeyarwady Region
Burmese writers
Burmese journalists
University of Yangon alumni
20th-century journalists